Work on the coinage tools for the Newfoundland five-cent coin began after the one-cent coin, so the coin has no legend. The first pattern is derived from the New Brunswick obverse with Newfoundland substituted for New Brunswick.

Queen Victoria Laureated Portrait, 1865-1896

Specifications

Mintages

Edward VII 1903-1908

The obverse for this denomination is that of the Dominion of Canada coins. The reverse, a new design by George W. DeSaulles, was one of the last coinage designs before his death.

Mintages

George V 1912-1929
The obverse is the same as for the Dominion of Canada issue and the reverse is the same as the Newfoundland Edward VII issue.

Specifications

Mintages

George VI 1938-1947
There was much debate as to whether the government of Newfoundland would keep producing a silver five cent coin or adopt a nickel five cent coin. Due to a strong conservative element, the decision was made to change only the cent. The reverse design was continued while the obverse had the effigy that was the standard portrait for the British colonial coinages.

The 1946 coin had the lowest mintage of any five cent coin. Published official mint reports, as well as unpublished mint accounting records, do not indicate any mintage of the five cent coin during 1946. The speculation is that the 1946 coin was actually minted in 1947. Therefore, the figures for 1946 and 1947 are considered unofficial.

Specifications

Mintages

References

Five-cent coins
 0.05